Dennis Dowidat (born 10 January 1990) is a German footballer who plays as a midfielder for TSV Meerbusch in the Oberliga Niederrhein.

Career

Dowidat first joined Borussia Mönchengladbach as a fourteen-year-old, and spent the next five years in the youth setup, followed by three playing in the reserve team. In July 2012 he signed for Preußen Münster of the 3. Liga, where he made his debut on the opening day of the 2012–13 season, as a substitute for Benjamin Siegert in a 2–0 win against Wacker Burghausen. He made eight appearances in the first half of the season, before returning to Gladbach in January 2013. After a further six months playing for the reserve team, he signed for Alemannia Aachen.

External links

1990 births
Living people
German footballers
Germany youth international footballers
Borussia Mönchengladbach II players
SC Preußen Münster players
Alemannia Aachen players
3. Liga players
Regionalliga players
Association football midfielders
Footballers from Düsseldorf